Vessna Perunovich is a Serbian-born visual artist based in Toronto, Ontario. She was born in 1960 in Zaječar, Serbia, FPR Yugoslavia. Her father was originally from Montenegro and her mother was from Serbia. Her family immigrated to Toronto in 1988. She earned her B.F.A in 1984 at the Academy of Fine Arts at the University of Belgrade, Yugoslavia. Three years later she earned her M.F.A. also from the Academy of Fine Arts at the University of Belgrade. In 1999, she participated as a guest lecturer at the Dundas School of Art in Hamilton, Ontario, titled "Naked/Perpetual Crises I". In 2004, she was invited to the University of Guelph in Ontario to guest lecture. In the same year, she was also invited by the Informal Architectures Symposium in Banff, Alberta to do an artist presentation. She is currently a sessional teacher at the Ontario College of Art and Design in Toronto and has been since 2005. Her most recent artist talks were from 2006: one at the Ontario College of Art and Design in Toronto and the other one in Havana, Cuba for the "International Artists' Presentation".

Perunovich works in a variety of media including sculpture, painting, drawing, video installation and performance. Her aim seems to be an attempt to express the most with the least amount of materials. She often uses pantyhose to create sculptural pieces. "Pantyhose for Perunovich is emblematic of society's efforts to contain and restrict our freedom, symbolizing the behavioral codes imposed upon us which prevent us from realizing our dreams and aspirations. "Vessna's multi-media explorations are inspired and derived from her personal experiences, yet they have an effect on all of our experiences; from our collective memories, anxieties, questions and desires. She utilizes her materials and converts them into imaginative depictions of the body, while exploring the conflicting boundaries of pleasure and pain. Perunovich filled pantyhose with everyday objects to stretch the material to test its physical limits.

References 

1960 births
Living people
Artists from Toronto
Canadian women painters
Canadian women sculptors
Canadian people of Montenegrin descent
Canadian people of Serbian descent
People from Zaječar
Yugoslav emigrants to Canada
21st-century Canadian women artists